Trillo is a municipality located in the province of Guadalajara, Spain. According to the 2007 census (INE), the municipality has a population of 1,371 inhabitants.

References 

Municipalities in the Province of Guadalajara